The Nike of Callimachus ( Níki tou Kallimákhou) also known as The Dedication of Callimachus, is a statue that the Athenians created in honour of Callimachus.

History 

Callimachus was the Athenian polemarch at the Battle of Marathon at 490 BC. He had the last vote and voted in favour of a battle, when the ten strategoi were split evenly on the matter.

He was killed at the battle and the Athenians erected the statue for him.

The statue was erected in a prominent spot near the north-west corner of the Parthenon (not the Parthenon that we can see today, but the previous temple which was destroyed by the Persians) on the Acropolis of Athens. The statue was severely damaged by the Persians a decade later (480 BC) when they conquered Athens. They burned and destroyed the city and its monuments, including the Nike of Callimachus (Perserschutt).

Statue 

The statue depicts Nike (Victory), in the form of a draped woman with wings running right, on top of an inscribed Ionic column. Its height is 4.68 meters and was made of Parian or Pentelic marble. Some parts of the statue such as the head, the hands and more were never recovered after the damage.

The neck of the Nike has nine holes for metal jewellery, which has been lost. She probably held a caduceus in her hand.

Inscription 

The text of the inscription on the monument was carved in two lines. The monument is a rare example of a preserved dedicatory epigram, with its statue and base, from the late archaic period.

Only 35% of the original text is visible due to the destruction.
The text on the column is below (the brackets indicate text which is missing because of the destruction and has been restored by Catharine Keesling):

Restoration 

On October 26, 2010 after it was restored, it was displayed to the public for the first time as a complete monument at the Acropolis Museum. The statue has been affixed to a metal column that holds the various parts in place and is built so that additional fragments can be attached if they are found. According to the curator of the new Acropolis Museum, the monument has been reconstructed in a modern fashion using only the original shards in their correct positions, so that a visitor might be able to see the authentic version.

The unveiling of the Nike monument was among a series of events scheduled during 2010 by the culture and tourism ministry of Greece to celebrate the 2,500th anniversary of the Battle of Marathon. During the unveiling of the statue the Greek minister stressed:

“Today we are not unveiling the monument of just another heroic general but a monument to a democratic process that changed the course of history."

He also reminded the audience of the words that Miltiades said to Callimachus just before the polemarch cast his vote:

“Everything now rests on you.”

Restoration

The statue is on display in the Archaic Monuments’ section of the Acropolis Museum. In the Museum in front of the original statue there is also a small copy showing how the statue looked when it was whole and undamaged.

See also 
 Achaemenid destruction of Athens

References

Acropolis of Athens
Acropolis Museum
Ancient Greek culture
Greek culture
Ancient Greek sculpture
Victory
Archaeological discoveries in Greece